Thulhiriya is a village in the Kegalle District, Sabaragamuwa Province, Sri Lanka.

History 
In 1968 the government established the state-owned Thulhiriya Textile Mill, it was privatised to Bombay Dyne in 1980 and then Kabool Lanka until 2003. This was the largest textile mill in Sri Lanka. The mill was constructed in an area of 14 acres and under one roof. In 2006 MAS Holdings established a fabric park in Thulhiriya, the country's first privately owned apparel intensive free trade zone. The fabric park spans  and provides employment to over 8,200 people. Since it was established a further eight companies have set up factories in the fabric park.

Thulhiriya has well-established road and railway links. The village is located on the A6 (Colombo - Kurunegala) highway and near the Alawwa railway station, which is on the Main Line (Colombo to Badulla).

References 

Populated places in North Western Province, Sri Lanka
Populated places in Kurunegala District